Donald Currie (born 6 March 1935) is an Australian field hockey player. He competed in the men's tournament at the 1960 Summer Olympics.

References

External links
 

1935 births
Living people
Australian male field hockey players
Olympic field hockey players of Australia
Field hockey players at the 1960 Summer Olympics
Sportspeople from Brisbane